Maurice Hirsch may refer to:

 Maurice de Hirsch (1831–1896), German Jewish financier and philanthropist
 Maurice Hirsch (footballer) (born 1993), German footballer